HDM may refer to:

 Haagsche Delftsche Mixed, a Dutch field hockey club based in Den Haag
 Haddenham & Thame Parkway railway station, in England
 Hamadan Airport in Iran
 Harvard Dictionary of Music
 Haus des Meeres, an aquarium in Vienna, Austria
 H. D. Moore, American computer security researcher
 HDM Furniture Industries, including furniture companies Henredon, Drexel Heritage and Maitland-Smith
 Herzog & de Meuron (HdM), a Swiss architectural firm
 High Standard HDM, a semiautomatic pistol
His Dark Materials, a trilogy of novels by Philip Pullman
 Hockey Day Minnesota
 Holistic Data Management
 Hot dark matter, a form of dark matter
 House dust mite
 Hoy de monterrey (Cuban cigar brand)
 Hard Dynamic Monsters (CS:GO Team)
 Health Data Movers (a company providing healthcare IT services)